Eclectic is a town in Elmore County, Alabama, United States. It incorporated in 1907. At the 2020 census, the population was 1,193. It is part of the Montgomery Metropolitan Statistical Area.

History
Eclectic was founded by Dr. M. L. Fielder, a practitioner of eclectic medicine, hence the name. It has been noted on lists of unusual place names.

The first post office in Eclectic was established in 1879.

Geography
Eclectic is located at  (32.641285, -86.038571).

The town is located along Alabama State Route 63, which runs from south to north through the center of town, leading northeast  to Alexander City and southwest  to the unincorporated community of Claud. Alabama State Route 170 connects the town to Wetumpka, the Elmore County seat,  to the southwest.

Demographics

2000 census
At the 2000 census there were 1,037 people, 409 households, and 280 families living in the town. The racial makeup of the town was 78.11% White, 19.19% Black or African American, 0.96% Native American, 0.10% Asian, 0.87% from other races, and 0.77% from two or more races. 1.83% of the population were Hispanic or Latino of any race.
Of the 409 households 33.3% had children under the age of 18 living with them, 45.7% were married couples living together, 16.9% had a female householder with no husband present, and 31.3% were non-families. 29.1% of households were one person and 14.7% were one person aged 65 or older. The average household size was 2.54 and the average family size was 3.14.

The age distribution was 30.1% under the age of 18, 6.4% from 18 to 24, 28.4% from 25 to 44, 19.0% from 45 to 64, and 16.1% 65 or older. The median age was 36 years. For every 100 females, there were 85.2 males. For every 100 females age 18 and over, there were 79.9 males.

The median household income was $30,906 and the median family income was $31,855. Males had a median income of $29,554 versus $18,162 for females. The per capita income for the town was $14,131. About 20.5% of families and 25.5% of the population were below the poverty line, including 32.6% of those under age 18 and 23.4% of those age 65 or over.

2010 census
At the 2010 census there were 1,001 people, 399 households, and 266 families living in the town. The racial makeup of the town was 86.4% White, 11.0% Black or African American, 0.4% Native American, 0.0% Asian, 0.0% from other races, and 2.1% from two or more races. 1.3% of the population were Hispanic or Latino of any race.
Of the 399 households 29.8% had children under the age of 18 living with them, 50.4% were married couples living together, 14.0% had a female householder with no husband present, and 33.3% were non-families. 29.6% of households were one person and 15.0% were one person aged 65 or older. The average household size was 2.51 and the average family size was 3.14.

The age distribution was 25.5% under the age of 18, 8.1% from 18 to 24, 23.0% from 25 to 44, 25.9% from 45 to 64, and 17.6% 65 or older. The median age was 39.9 years. For every 100 females, there were 82.3 males. For every 100 females age 18 and over, there were 79.8 males.

The median household income was $34,750 and the median family income was $42,188. Males had a median income of $35,815 versus $27,684 for females. The per capita income for the town was $19,181. About 8.6% of families and 13.1% of the population were below the poverty line, including 22.4% of those under age 18 and 5.7% of those age 65 or over.

2020 census

As of the 2020 United States census, there were 1,193 people, 446 households, and 330 families residing in the town.

Education
It is in the Elmore County Public School System.

Notable people
Ben Grubbs, former offensive guard for Auburn University, who played for the Baltimore Ravens, New Orleans Saints, and Kansas City Chiefs over a nine-year NFL career
Ludd M. Spivey, president of Florida Southern College from 1925 to 1957

Gallery

References

External links
Elmore County Corporate Development website(ECEDA)

Towns in Elmore County, Alabama
Towns in Alabama
Montgomery metropolitan area
Populated places established in 1907